Swim or SWIM may refer to:

Movement and sport
 Swim, a fad dance
 Aquatic locomotion, the act of biologically propelled motion through a liquid medium
 Human swimming, the useful or recreational activity of movement through water
 Swimming (sport), the competitive sport of swimming

Music

Groups and labels

 swim ~, a record label founded by Wire guitarist and singer Colin Newman, and Minimal Compact bass player and singer Malka Spigel

Albums and EPs

 Swim (Caribou album), a 2010 album by Caribou
 Swim (Emily's Army EP), 2014
 Swim (Feeder EP), a 1996 EP by the band Feeder, later re-released as an 11-track album
 Swim (July for Kings album), the Ohio-based rock band's 2002 major-label debut album
 Swim, a 2008 album from indie band Whispertown 2000
S W I M, a 2015 album by Die! Die! Die! with a title believed to mean "Someone Who Isn't Me"

Songs

 "Swim" (song), a 1993 song by the alternative rock band Fishbone
 "Swim", a song from Bic Runga's album Drive
 "Swim", a song from Brockhampton's album Saturation
 "Swim", a song from Jack's Mannequin's album The Glass Passenger
 "Swim", a song from Madonna's album Ray of Light

SWIM
 Surface Water Improvement and Management Program, a Florida state program to improve water quality
 System Wide Information Management, a technology to help provide data sharing of Air Traffic Management system information
 Sander-Wozniak Integrated Machine, an Apple floppy-disk controller
 SWIM Protocol (Scalable Weakly consistent Infection-style process group Membership), a group membership protocol in computer science

See also
Adult Swim
 Swimmer (disambiguation)
 Swimming (disambiguation)